Scott Oden (born June 24, 1967) is an American writer best known for his historical novels set in Ancient Egypt and Ancient Greece.  His work imitates the styles and themes of the 1930s pulps, most notably the historical fiction and fantasy of Texan author Robert E. Howard.

Biography
Oden was born in Columbus, Indiana in 1967.  He graduated from Albert P. Brewer High School in 1985 and attended John C. Calhoun State Community College in Decatur, Alabama, where he studied English and History.  Oden began writing at the age of 14, and his first published work was a role-playing game called "Rogue Warrior" in 1986—only memorable, Oden says, for the artwork supplied by a teen-aged Cully Hamner.

Oden's breakthrough novel was 2005's Men of Bronze.  It was followed in 2006 by Memnon and in 2010 with The Lion of Cairo, which mixed pulp-style action and sorcery with Crusader politics in Fatimid Egypt.

Oden returned in June 2017 with his critically acclaimed “Orc novel”, A Gathering of Ravens — the first in a projected trilogy of stand-alone novels featuring the savage orc Grimnir. The second book, Twilight of the Gods, appeared in February 2020.

Influences
Oden identifies his writing influences as J. R. R. Tolkien, H. P. Lovecraft, Robert E. Howard, Mary Renault, Harold Lamb, Karl Edward Wagner, and Steven Pressfield.

Bibliography

Novels
Men of Bronze (June 2005, Medallion Press)
Memnon (August 2006, Medallion Press)
The Lion of Cairo (December 2010, Thomas Dunne Books)
A Gathering of Ravens (June 2017, Thomas Dunne Books)
Twilight of the Gods (February 2020, St. Martin's Press)

Short stories
 "Theos Khthonios" (2011, in Lawyers in Hell)
 "Amarante: A Tale of Old Tharduin" (2012, self-published)
 "Sanctuary" (2012, self-published)
”Xenia in the Court of the Winds” (2017, in A Sea of Sorrow: A Novel of Odysseus)
“A Shadow of Vengeance” (2019, serialized in Marvel’s Savage Sword of Conan, issues #1-#12)
“Conan Unconquered” (2019, included in Conan Unconquered Deluxe Edition from Funcom)

Non-fiction 

 “Introduction” (2011, Sword Woman and Other Historical Adventures by Robert E. Howard)
 “An Empire of Ghosts and Smoke” (2021, Robert E. Howard Changed My Life, edited by Jason M. Waltz)

References

External links

1967 births
Living people
21st-century American novelists
American historical novelists
American male novelists
Novelists from Indiana
Writers of historical fiction set in antiquity
21st-century American male writers